The Northern Territory is a federal Australian territory in north-central Australia. It is the third largest Australian federal division with an area of  but the least populous with  inhabitants as at June 2019. The Northern Territory is divided administratively into 17 Local government areas (LGAs) generally known as Councils who are responsible for providing local government services.

Area types

As of 1 July 2008, there were two classifications of local government in the Northern Territory:
 Municipalities (predominantly inner-city suburban areas and smaller rural towns), of which there were five; and
 Shires or Regions (predominantly rural or outer suburban areas), of which there were eleven shire councils.

The Northern Territory was unusual as a comparatively large share of the territory's population lived in unincorporated areas.  In 2006, prior to the reorganisation of local government areas in the territory, 92 percent of the land area ( out of ) with 16 percent of the population (30,523 out of 192,898), was unincorporated. This anomaly is due to the territory's very low population density, just 0.16 people per km2 (0.099 people per sq mi).

Most of the unincorporated areas disappeared as a result of local government reform in 2008.

By comparison, in the only other states or territories in Australia with unincorporated areas, only 0.02% of the population of New South Wales, 0.002% of Victoria's population and 0.6% of the population of South Australia, live in unincorporated areas.

Current local government areas

Former local government areas

Prior to 1 July 2008, local government areas in the Northern Territory were classified as either :
Community Government Councils of which 51 existed,
Incorporated Associations (Commonwealth) of which three existed,
Municipalities of which six existed and 
Special Purpose Towns of which there is only one example.

Towns
 Town of Jabiru (special purpose town)
 Town of Tennant Creek

Community Government Councils
 Alpurrurulam CGC
 Angurugu CGC
 Anmatjere CGC
 Arltarlpilta CGC
 Belyuen CGC (now Belyuen Shire)
 Binjari CGC
 Borroloola CGC
 Coomalie CGC (now Coomalie Shire)
 Cox Peninsula CGC (now Wagait Shire)
 Daguragu CGC
 Elliott District CGC
 Jilkminggan CGC
 Kunbarllanjnja CGC
 Lajamanu CGC
 Ltyentye Apurte CGC
 Marngarr CGC
 Mataranka CGC
 Nauiyu Nambiyu CGC
 Numbulwar Numburindi CGC
 Nyirranggulung Mardrulk Ngadberre Regional Council
 Pine Creek CGC
 Tapatjatjaka CGC
 Thamarrurr Regional Council
 Timber Creek CGC
 Tiwi Islands CGC (now Tiwi Islands Region)
 Walangeri Ngumpinku CGC
 Wallace Rockhole CGC
 Watiyawanu CGC
 Yuendumu CGC
 Yugul Mangi CGC

Incorporated Communities
 Aherrenge Community
 Ali Curung Community
 Amoonguna Community
 Aputula Community
 Areyonga Community
 Galiwin'ku Community
 Gapuwiyak Community
 Ikuntji Community
 Imanpa Community
 Kaltukatjara Community
 Maningrida Community
 Milingimbi Community
 Milyakburra Community
 Minjilang Community
 Mutitjulu Community
 Nganmarriyanga Community
 Ntaria Community (Hermannsburg)
 Nyirrpi Community
 Papunya Community
 Peppimenarti Community
 Ramingining Community
 Umbakumba Community
 Urapuntja Aboriginal Corporation
 Walungurru Community
 Warruwi Community
 Yuelamu Community

Unincorporated Area
 Unincorporated Area: A contiguous 92 percent of the area did not belong to any local government area. The LGAs were enclaves within unincorporated territory.

See also
 Local government in Australia
 List of places in the Northern Territory by population

References

Sources
 

 
Local Government Areas